The U-Bix Classic was a golf tournament held in Australia from 1984 to 1987 at The Federal Golf Club, Canberra. The event was called the Honeywell Classic in 1984. The tournament was held during November in 1984 and 1985, and again in January 1987, with no edition in 1986 due to being rescheduled from November to January. This proved to be the last time the tournament was held as sponsors Konica withdrew their support later in the year. The event incorporated the New South Wales PGA Championship.

Prize money for the U-Bix Classic was A$35,000 in 1984, A$50,000 in 1985 and A$100,000 in 1987.

Winners

References

Former PGA Tour of Australasia events
Golf tournaments in Australia
Recurring sporting events established in 1984
Recurring events disestablished in 1987